The Spicer Baronetcy, of Lancaster Gate in the Borough of Paddington, is a title in the Baronetage of the United Kingdom. It was created on 17 July 1906 for Albert Spicer. He was Chairman of James Spicer & Sons Ltd (since 1922 ″Spicers Ltd″), paper makers, and also represented Monmouth and Hackney Central in the House of Commons as a Liberal. The fourth Baronet did not use his title.

Spicer baronets, of Lancaster Gate (1906)
Sir Albert Spicer, 1st Baronet (1847–1934)
Sir Albert Dykes Spicer, 2nd Baronet (1880–1966)
Sir Stewart Dykes Spicer, 3rd Baronet (1888–1968)
Peter James Spicer, presumed 4th Baronet (1921–1993)
Sir Nicholas Adrian Albert Spicer, 5th Baronet (born 1953)

References
Kidd, Charles, Williamson, David (editors). Debrett's Peerage and Baronetage (1990 edition). New York: St Martin's Press, 1990.

Spicer